Oyeyemi is a Yoruba given name. Loosely interpreted, it means "the kingship belongs to me".

Notable people include:
Helen Oyeyemi (born 1984), British novelist
 Modupe-Oreoluwa Oyeyemi Ola (born 1990), Nigerian rapper and singer
 Fawole John Oyeyemi (born 1985), Nigerian chess player.
Bunmi Oyeyemi Julius-Adeoye Nigerian playwright and pioneering H.O.D, Department of Theater Arts, Redeemer's University Nigeria
Boboye Oyeyemi (born 1960), Federal Road Safety Corps corps marshal/head

Yoruba given names
Yoruba-language surnames